The Maryland Salem Children's Trust Inc. was a Christian 501(c)(3) organization, member of Salem International, founded in 1979 by Louise Sutermeister and located in Frostburg and dedicated to children who "have experienced repeated trauma at a young age". Dr. Terry J. Russell, Chair of the Social Work Department at Frostburg State University was the unpaid President of the organization from 2009-2014. According to the organisations own website, it ceased operations in 2020.

References

Organizations established in 1979
Christian charities based in the United States
Children's charities based in the United States
Charities based in Maryland
Educational organizations based in the United States